Daniel Freyberg (born 4 February 1982) is a Swedish-born Finnish heavy metal guitarist, best known as a former guitarist for Finnish metal band Children of Bodom and Bodom After Midnight. He is the current vocalist and guitarist of Naildown. He is also a former guitarist for Norther.

Discography

With Naildown
Eyes Wide Open (single – 2005)
World Domination (2005)
Judgement Ride (e-single – 2007)
Dreamcrusher (2007)

With Norther
Circle Regenerated (2011)

With Children of Bodom
Hexed (2019)

With Bodom After Midnight
Paint the Sky with Blood (2021)

External links
Official Norther website
Daniel Freyberg at Metal from Finland

1982 births
Children of Bodom members
Finnish heavy metal guitarists
Finnish heavy metal singers
Living people
Musicians from Stockholm
Norther members
Rhythm guitarists